Pietro Roman (born 20 September 1989) is an Italian Olympic eventing rider. He competed at the 2016 Summer Olympics in Rio de Janeiro where he finished 23rd in the individual and 9th in the team competition.

Romam is an athlete of the G.S. Fiamme Oro.

Biography
Roman also participated at the 2015 European Eventing Championships, where he placed 6th with the Italian team in the team event. His brother Luca also participated at the 2016 Olympics. They became the second set of Roman brothers that represented Italy at the Olympics, as their father Federico and their uncle Mauro were part of the Italian eventing squad that took team silver at the 1980 Games in Moscow. Federico also won an individual gold at the Games.

References

Living people
1989 births
Italian male equestrians
Italian event riders
Equestrians at the 2016 Summer Olympics
Olympic equestrians of Italy
Equestrians of Fiamme Oro